The 2017 Africa Cup of Nations (abbreviated as AFCON 2017 or CAN 2017), known as the Total 2017 Africa Cup of Nations for sponsorship reasons, was the 31st edition of the Africa Cup of Nations, the biennial international men's football championship of Africa organized by the Confederation of African Football (CAF). The tournament was scheduled to be hosted by Libya, until CAF rescinded its hosting rights in August 2014 due to the Second Libyan civil war. The tournament was instead hosted by Gabon. This event was also part of the Africa Cup of Nations 60th Anniversary.

Cameroon won their fifth title after defeating seven-time champions Egypt 2–1 in the final. Burkina Faso finished third after beating Ghana 1–0 in the third place play-off.

As champions, Cameroon qualified for the 2017 FIFA Confederations Cup in Russia. Tournament hosts Gabon and defending champions Ivory Coast were both eliminated in the group stage.

Host selection

First bidding
Bids :

CAF received 3 bids before 30 September 2010, the deadline, to host either the 2015 Africa Cup of Nations or 2017 from DR Congo, Morocco and South Africa. All three bids were originally put on a shortlist. CAF then began an inspection procedure, on November and December 2010, intending to visit each bidding country to view stadiums, infrastructure, and football interest. They inspected the DR Congo first. Shortly after the inspection, DR Congo informed CAF that they would be withdrawing their bids for both the 2015 and 2017 Africa Cup of Nations tournaments. Morocco was the next country to be inspected, with CAF visiting the country in early November 2010. South Africa was inspected in December 2010.

On 29 January, during the 2011 CAF Super Cup, the CAF executive committee decided that Morocco would host 2015 Africa Cup of Nations, while the 2017 edition would be held in South Africa. However, due to the Libyan Civil War, Libya and South Africa traded years with South Africa hosting in 2013 and Libya hosting in 2017.

Second bidding 
Bids :

Algeria
Egypt
Gabon
Ghana

After Libya was withdrawn as the venue on 22 August 2014, the CAF announced that they would be receiving applications for the new hosts until 30 September 2014.

Algeria, Egypt, Gabon, and Ghana, were determined by the CAF to be compliant with the host criteria. Later, Egypt withdrew.

Other countries which expressed an interest but did not bid included Ethiopia, Mali, and Tanzania. Kenya discussed a joint bid with neighbors Rwanda and Uganda, but eventually bid alone.

On 8 April 2015, CAF President Issa Hayatou announced Gabon as the replacement hosts following votes by the CAF Executive Committee.

Qualification

The draw for the qualification stage took place on 8 April 2015, immediately after the announcement of the host nation. The host nation team were also drawn into a group and would play games against those in that group; however, those matches would only be considered as friendlies and not counted for the standings.

51 nations entered the qualifying stage with Eritrea and Somalia declining to enter and Chad withdrawing.

Due to the cancellation of Morocco being hosts of the 2015 edition, the national team of Morocco were originally banned by CAF from entering the 2017 and 2019 Africa Cups of Nations. However, the ban was overturned by the Court of Arbitration for Sport, allowing Morocco to enter the tournament.

Three-time champions Nigeria did not qualify.

Qualified teams
The following 16 teams qualified for the final tournament.

Venues

The four venues were confirmed in October 2016.

Squads

Each team could register a squad of 23 players.

Match officials
The following referees were chosen for the 2017 Africa Cup of Nations.

Referees

  Mehdi Abid Charef
  Joshua Bondo
  Sidi Alioum
  Denis Dembélé
  Gehad Grisha
  Bamlak Tessema Weyesa
  Eric Otogo-Castane
  Bakary Gassama
  Hamada Nampiandraza
  Redouane Jiyed
  Mahamadou Keita
  Ali Lemghaifry
  Daniel Bennett
  Malang Diedhiou
  Bernard Camille
  Youssef Essrayri
  Janny Sikazwe

Assistant referees

  Albdelhak Etchiali
  Jerson Emiliano Dos Santos
  Jean-Claude Birumushahu
  Evarist Menkouande
  Elvis Guy Noupue Nguegoue
  Marius Donatien Tan
  Tahssen Abo El Sadat Bedyer
  Théophile Vinga
  Aboubacar Doumbouya
  Marwa Range
  Redouane Achik
  Arsénio Chadreque Marengula
  Yahaya Mahamadou
  Abel Baba
  Olivier Safari Kabene
  Djibril Camara
  El Hadji Malick Samba
  Zakhele Siwela
  Ali Waleed Ahmed
  Mohammed Abdallah Ibrahim
  Anouar Hmila

Format
Only the hosts received an automatic qualification spot; the other 15 teams qualified through a qualification tournament. At the finals, the 16 teams were drawn into four groups of four teams each. The teams in each group played a single round robin. After the group stage, the top two teams from each group advanced to the quarter-finals. The quarter-final winners advanced to the semi-finals. The semi-final losers played in a third place match, while the semi-final winners played in the final.

Draw
The draw took place on 19 October 2016, 18:30 UTC+1, in Libreville, Gabon.

The seedings approved by the Organising Committee of the Africa Cup of Nations at its meeting on Monday, 26 September 2016 at the CAF headquarters in Cairo, Egypt, was determined taking into account the performance of the qualified teams during the following competitions:
Africa Cup of Nations final tournaments (2012, 2013, 2015)
Africa Cup of Nations qualifiers (2013, 2015, 2017)
FIFA World Cup (2014)
FIFA World Cup qualifiers (2014)

Group stage
Group winners and runners-up advanced to the quarter-finals.

All times are local, WAT (UTC+1).

Tiebreakers
The teams were ranked according to points (3 points for a win, 1 point for a draw, 0 points for a loss). If tied on points, tiebreakers were applied in the following order (Regulations Article 74):
 Number of points obtained in games between the teams concerned;
 Goal difference in games between the teams concerned;
 Goals scored in games between the teams concerned;
 If, after applying criteria 1 to 3 to teams concerned, two or three teams still had an equal ranking, criteria 1 to 3 were reapplied exclusively to the matches between these teams in question to determine their final rankings. If this procedure did not lead to a decision, criteria 5 to 7 applied;
 Goal difference in all games;
 Goals scored in all games;
 Drawing of lots.

Group A

Group B

Group C

Group D

Knockout stage

In the knockout stages, if a match was level at the end of normal playing time, extra time was played (two periods of 15 minutes each) and followed, if necessary, by a penalty shoot-out to determine the winner, except for the play-off for third place, where no extra time was played (Regulations Article 75).

Bracket

Quarter-finals

Semi-finals

Third place play-off

Final

Statistics

Goalscorers

3 goals

 Junior Kabananga

2 goals

 Riyad Mahrez
 Islam Slimani
 Aristide Bancé
 Préjuce Nakoulma
 Michael Ngadeu-Ngadjui
 Paul-José M'Poku
 Mohamed Salah
 Pierre-Emerick Aubameyang
 André Ayew
 Sadio Mané
 Naïm Sliti

1 goal

 Sofiane Hanni
 Issoufou Dayo
 Alain Traoré
 Bertrand Traoré
 Vincent Aboubakar
 Christian Bassogog
 Benjamin Moukandjo
 Nicolas Nkoulou
 Sébastien Siani
 Neeskens Kebano
 Firmin Ndombe Mubele
 Mohamed Elneny
 Kahraba
 Abdallah Said
 Jordan Ayew
 Asamoah Gyan
 Piqueti
 Juary Soares
 Wilfried Bony
 Serey Dié
 Yves Bissouma
 Rachid Alioui
 Aziz Bouhaddouz
 Youssef En-Nesyri
 Romain Saïss
 Papakouli Diop
 Kara Mbodji
 Henri Saivet
 Moussa Sow
 Mathieu Dossevi
 Kodjo Fo-Doh Laba
 Wahbi Khazri
 Taha Yassine Khenissi
 Youssef Msakni
 Farouk Miya
 Kudakwashe Mahachi
 Tendai Ndoro
 Nyasha Mushekwi
 Knowledge Musona

Own goals

 Aïssa Mandi (against Tunisia)
 Rudinilson Silva (against Burkina Faso)

Awards
The following awards were given at the conclusion of the tournament:

Total Man of the Competition
 Christian Bassogog

Top Scorer
 Junior Kabananga (3 goals)

Fair Play prize

CAF Team of the tournament

Final standings
Per statistical convention in football, matches decided in extra time are counted as wins and losses, while matches decided by a penalty shoot-out are counted as draws.

|-
| colspan="11"| Eliminated in the quarter-finals
|-

|-
| colspan="11"| Eliminated in group stage
|-

|}

Sponsorship
In July 2016, Total secured an eight-year sponsorship package from the Confederation of African Football (CAF) to support ten of its principal competitions, including the Africa Cup of Nations (renamed the Total Africa Cup of Nations).

Match ball
Mitre took over as the official match ball supplier following the expiration of the contract between Adidas and CAF. CAF Mitre Delta Hyperseam was the name of the official match ball.

Mascot
The official mascot of the tournament was "Samba", a black panther.

Controversy

Website attack
On 21 January, Russian hacking group New World Hackers claimed to have taken the official CAF website down in response to CAF's decision to choose Gabon as host nation. "We did this in protest against Gabon", the person claiming to be one of the hackers wrote in an email. "They are running the Africa Cup in a country where the dictator Ali Bongo is killing innocent people!"

Media

Broadcasting

 - Available in the following countries: Serbia, Croatia, Bosnia and Herzegovina, Montenegro and Macedonia

References

External links

2017 Africa Cup of Nations, CAFonline.com

 
2017
Nations
2017 in Gabonese sport
International association football competitions hosted by Gabon
January 2017 sports events in Africa
February 2017 sports events in Africa